Sarah Lois Harmer (born November 12, 1970) is a Canadian singer, songwriter and environmental activist.

Early life
Born and raised in Burlington, Ontario, Harmer gained her first exposure to the musician's lifestyle as a teenager, when her older sister started taking her to Tragically Hip concerts.

Career
At the age of 17, Harmer was invited to join a Toronto band, The Saddletramps. For three years, she performed with The Saddletramps while pursuing her studies in philosophy and women's studies at Queen's University.

After leaving The Saddletramps, Harmer put together a band of her own with several Kingston, Ontario musicians, and chose the name Weeping Tile. The band released its first independent cassette in 1994. Soon afterward, they signed to a major label, and the cassette was re-released in 1995 as Eepee. The band performed regularly on the rock club circuit and on campus radio with their subsequent albums, but never broke through to the mainstream, and broke up in 1998 after being dropped from their label.

Also in 1998, Harmer recorded a set of pop standards as a Christmas gift for her father. After hearing it, her friends and family convinced her to release it as an album, and in 1999 she released it independently as Songs for Clem. Harmer began working on another album, and in 2000, she released You Were Here. In 2001 she toured around Canada and the US in support of the album.

A poppier, more laid-back effort than her work with Weeping Tile, You Were Here was a commercial success, and led to the hit singles "Basement Apartment" and "Don't Get Your Back Up". The album also appeared on many critics' year-end lists, including TIME magazine, which called it the year's best debut album. It was eventually certified platinum for sales of 100,000 copies in Canada. Almost half of the album (including both of its major hits) consisted of songs she had previously recorded with Weeping Tile or The Saddletramps.

In 2002, her song "Silver Road" was featured as the lead track of the soundtrack of the film Men With Brooms.

In 2004, she released All of Our Names. The album included the singles "Almost", which made the top 20 on Canadian pop charts, and "Pendulums". All of Our Names won the JUNO Award for Best Adult Alternative Album, a new award category in 2005.

Her fourth album, I'm a Mountain, was released in Canada in November 2005 and in the United States in February 2006. It was nominated for the 2006 Polaris Music Prize, a jury-selected $20,000 cash prize for the Canadian album of the year.

Harmer has also appeared as a guest vocalist on albums by other artists, including Blue Rodeo, Great Big Sea, Rheostatics, Bruce Cockburn, Luther Wright and the Wrongs, Loomer, Skydiggers, The Weakerthans, Neko Case, Great Lake Swimmers, The Tragically Hip and Bob Wiseman.

In February 2007, Harmer received three Juno Award nominations. I'm a Mountain was nominated for Best Adult Alternative Album and her DVD Escarpment Blues won the JUNO Award for Best Music DVD. Harmer herself was also nominated for Songwriter of the Year for her work on "I Am Aglow", "Oleander" and "Escarpment Blues".

In 2010, Harmer released a fifth album, Oh Little Fire, which was nominated for three Juno Awards. The album signaled a shift toward a more rock-based sound.

In 2011, Harmer participated in the National Parks Project, visiting British Columbia's Gwaii Haanas National Park Reserve and Haida Heritage Site with Bry Webb, Jim Guthrie and filmmaker Scott Smith. She was also commissioned by CBC Radio 2 to write an original campfire song for the network.

On August 19, 2016, Harmer and Jim Creeggan appeared on CBC Radio's Q to perform a live cover of The Tragically Hip's "Morning Moon". That year Harmer also performed at the Edmonton Folk Music Festival.

In 2018, Harmer contributed the song "Just Get Here" to the compilation album The Al Purdy Songbook. In the same year, she performed at the Juno Awards of 2018 in a tribute to the late Gord Downie, performing a medley of "Introduce Yerself" and "Bobcaygeon" in collaboration with Dallas Green and Kevin Hearn.

Her newest album, Are You Gone, was released in February 2020 on Arts & Crafts. It was longlisted for the 2020 Polaris Music Prize, and nominated for Best Adult Alternative Album at the Juno Awards of 2021.

Activism

In 2005, Harmer co-founded PERL (Protecting Escarpment Rural Land), an organization which campaigned to protect the Niagara Escarpment from a proposed gravel development which would see some parts of wilderness near the escarpment removed. To support the organization, she and her acoustic band embarked on a tour of the escarpment, hiking the Bruce Trail and performing at theatres and community halls in towns along the way. A documentary DVD of this tour was released in 2006 as Escarpment Blues. Harmer also coauthored a book about the campaign, The Last Stand: A Journey Through the Ancient Cliff-Face Forest of the Niagara Escarpment, which was published in 2007. In October 2012, PERL won their case against the development.

Harmer has performed and canvassed in support of the NDP and politician Marilyn Churley, who also promoted the protection of the Niagara Escarpment. She has also performed in support of Ontario Green Party Leader and MPP Mike Schreiner.

On March 24, 2018, she joined the demonstration at Kinder Morgan's Burnaby Terminal to protest against the expansion of the Trans Mountain pipeline.

In February 2019, she spoke against the Ontario government's proposed Bill 66 at a Kingston City Council meeting.

In January 2022, Sarah helped launch the Reform Gravel Mining Coalition with co-chair Graham Flint. The RGMC seeks to reform the gravel mining industry in Ontario.

Family
Her niece Georgia Harmer, the daughter of Sarah's sister Mary with their former Weeping Tile bandmate Gord Tough, is a singer-songwriter whose debut album Stay in Touch was released in April 2022 on Arts & Crafts Productions.

Discography

Albums

Singles 

In 2007, Harmer also reunited with Weeping Tile to record a song, "Public Square", for the Rheostatics tribute album The Secret Sessions.

Publications
Peter E. Kelly, Douglas W. Larson, Sarah Harmer, The Last Stand : A Journey Through the Ancient Cliff-Face Forest of the Niagara Escarpment, Natural Heritage Books, 2007,  (paperback).

References

External links

 www.sarahharmer.com

1970 births
Canadian alternative country singers
Canadian folk guitarists
Canadian women folk guitarists
Canadian folk singer-songwriters
Canadian pop guitarists
Canadian rock guitarists
Canadian women singer-songwriters
Canadian women rock singers
Juno Award for Adult Alternative Album of the Year winners
Living people
People from Burlington, Ontario
Queen's University at Kingston alumni
Musicians from Ontario
Writers from Ontario
Canadian environmentalists
Canadian women environmentalists
Zoë Records artists
Canadian women pop singers
20th-century Canadian women singers
20th-century Canadian guitarists
21st-century Canadian women singers
21st-century Canadian guitarists
Canadian folk-pop singers
Canadian folk rock musicians
Arts & Crafts Productions artists
20th-century women guitarists
21st-century women guitarists